Nathalie Mpaka, is an accountant and corporate executive at BK Group Plc (formerly Bank of Kigali), the largest commercial bank in Rwanda. She is the chief financial officer at BK Group.

Education
Mpaka has a Bachelor of Arts degree in Accounting and Finance, obtained from the Birmingham City University, in Birmingham, United Kingdom, in 2006. She is also a Chartered Certified Accountant, recognized by the Association of Chartered Certified Accountants (ACCA), of the United Kingdom. In addition, she is a member of the Institute of Certified Public Accountants in Rwanda (ICPAR).

Career
She was then hired as a Chartered Certified Accountant, by White Stuff Clothing, a chain of over 115 clothing stores in the United Kingdom, working there  for five years from 2007 until 2012.

In 2012, she relocated to Rwanda and was hired by the Bank of Kigali as a Financial Reporting Manager, working there for two years. In December 2014, she was promoted to Chief Financial Officer, a position she still occupies as of March 2019.

Other considerations
She is a member of the board of directors at Bank of Kigali General Insurance, a subsidiary of BK Group Plc. She concurrently serves as a member of the senior management team at the bank. She is also a member of Governing Council at the Institute of Certified Public Accountants of Rwanda.

See also
 Diane Karusisi

References

External links
 Website of Bank of Kigali
 Profile of Nathalie Mpaka: Chief Financial Officer of BK Group Plc (formerly, Bank of Kigali Limited)

Living people
Rwandan accountants
Rwandan women in business
Alumni of Birmingham City University
Year of birth missing (living people)